Loxothylacus is a genus of parasitic barnacles in the family Sacculinidae. There are more than 20 described species in Loxothylacus.

Species
These species belong to the genus Loxothylacus:

 Loxothylacus amoenus Boschma, 1940
 Loxothylacus aristatus Boschma, 1931
 Loxothylacus armatus Boschma, 1949
 Loxothylacus auritus Boschma, 1954
 Loxothylacus bicorniger Boschma, 1933
 Loxothylacus brachythrix Boschma, 1940
 Loxothylacus caribaeus Boschma, 1974
 Loxothylacus carinatus (Kossmann, 1872)
 Loxothylacus corculum (Kossmann, 1872)
 Loxothylacus desmothrix Boschma, 1931
 Loxothylacus echioides Boschma, 1940
 Loxothylacus engeli Boschma, 1968
 Loxothylacus ihlei Boschma, 1949
 Loxothylacus kossmanni Boschma, 1955
 Loxothylacus longipilus (Boschma, 1933)
 Loxothylacus musivus Boschma, 1940
 Loxothylacus omissus Boschma, 1957
 Loxothylacus panopaei (Gissler, 1884)
 Loxothylacus perarmatus Reinhard & Reischman, 1958
 Loxothylacus sclerothrix Boschma, 1933
 Loxothylacus setaceus Boschma, 1931
 Loxothylacus spinulosus Boschma, 1928
 Loxothylacus strandi Boschma, 1936
 Loxothylacus texanus Boschma, 1933
 Loxothylacus tomentosus Shiino, 1943
 Loxothylacus torridus Boschma, 1940
 Loxothylacus variabilis Boschma, 1940
 Loxothylacus vepretus Boschma, 1947

References

External links

 

Barnacles